Wilbert Hagarty (January 9, 1888 – 1963) was a farmer and political figure in Saskatchewan. He represented Elrose in the Legislative Assembly of Saskatchewan from 1921 to 1929 as a Liberal.

He was born in Elora, Ontario, the son of Michael Hagarty and Mary Grey, and was educated there. Hagarty lived in Lucky Lake, Saskatchewan.

References 

Saskatchewan Liberal Party MLAs
1888 births
1963 deaths